Dorcadion narlianum is a species of beetle in the family Cerambycidae. It was described by Özdikmen, Mercan and Cihan in 2012. It is known from Turkey.

See also 
Dorcadion

References

narlianum
Beetles described in 2012